Cricket is the national sport of Afghanistan. Beginning in the mid 1800s, Cricket has been widely popular in Afghanistan, though progress on the international level was slow. In 1995, The Afghanistan Cricket Board was founded. Afghanistan became an affiliate member of ICC in 2001, after forming a national team. From 2008 to 2013, Afghanistan went from Division Five of the World Cricket League to a Full Associate Member. Afghanistan debuted in the 2015 Cricket World Cup. 
Afghanistan qualified for finals in ICC World Cup Qualifier 2018  and defeated West Indies in finals. 2019 World Cup was 2nd World Cup which Afghanistan qualified. They qualified under the captaincy Asgar Afghan.

Cricket World Cup record

World Cup Record (By Team)

2015 Cricket World Cup

The 2015 Cricket World was the first Cricket World Cup Afghanistan participated in. Afghanistan was grouped with hosts Australia and New Zealand. The group also included test playing nations Sri Lanka, England and Bangladesh, along with Scotland.

2015 World Cup matches

2019 Cricket World Cup

2019 World Cup Was 2nd World Cup in which Afghanistan participated. This World Cup was in Round robin format where Afghanistan faced all the other teams which include Australia, Bangladesh, England, India, New Zealand, Pakistan, South Africa, Sri Lanka and West Indies, but couldn't manage to beat anyone.

2019 World Cup Matches

See also
Afghanistan national cricket team
Cricket in Afghanistan
2015 Cricket World Cup
2019 Cricket World Cup

References

Afghanistan in international cricket
History of the Cricket World Cup
Cricket in Afghanistan